Pasjača can refer to:
 Pasjača (Prokuplje), village in Serbia
 Pasjača (Niš), village
 Pasjača (mountain), mountain in Serbia
 Pasjača Beach, a short narrow shoreline in Konavle, Croatia